Lőrinci is a town in Heves County, Hungary, situated on the Zagyva River just north of Hatvan, in the northwest corner of the Great Hungarian Plain. The northern district of the town is called Selyp. György Kepes was born here in 1906. A large power plant overshadows the south of the town.

References

External links

  in Hungarian

Populated places in Heves County
Socialist planned cities
Planned cities in Hungary